Clinton Astor Conatser (July 24, 1921 – August 23, 2019) was an American professional baseball player. An outfielder, Conatser played 1 seasons for the Boston Braves of Major League Baseball and was a member of the 1948 Braves, the last Boston-based team to win a National League pennant.

His professional career began in 1939, and he bounced around in the farm systems of the Cleveland Indians and Detroit Tigers before being drafted by the Braves from the Seattle Rainiers of the Pacific Coast League after the 1947 season. He was a member of the Braves for the entire 1948 campaign as a platoon outfielder, batting .277 in 77 games with three home runs and 23 runs batted in. He pinch hit a single in four at bats in the 1948 World Series, which Boston lost to the Indians in six games. Conatser added three more home runs in 1949 and batted .263, but was demoted to the Braves' Milwaukee Brewers Triple-A affiliate in July. All told, he batted .271 in 143 Major League games with six homers and 39 RBI.

Conatser spent the remainder of his playing career at the Triple-A level, retiring after the 1952 Pacific Coast League season. He died on August 23, 2019 in Laguna Hills, California.

References

External links

1921 births
2019 deaths
Baseball players from Los Angeles
Boston Braves players
Buffalo Bisons (minor league) players
Cedar Rapids Raiders players
Charleston Senators players
Dallas Rebels players
Fargo-Moorhead Twins players
Flint Gems players
Hollywood Stars players
Johnstown Johnnies players
Logan Indians players
Major League Baseball outfielders
Milwaukee Brewers (minor league) players
Portland Beavers players
St. Paul Saints (AA) players
Seattle Rainiers players
John C. Fremont High School alumni